Cocumscussoc is a brook and surrounding region in what is now Wickford, Rhode Island. The Cocumscussoc Brook flows into Mill Cove off of Wickford Harbor. In the 1630s-1640s Roger Williams started a trading post with the Narragansetts likely northeast of the brook and harbor which was an ideal location because this was near the shore where the Narragansetts created wampum which was traded as currency for other goods. The exact location of Williams' trading post has not been located.  Adjacent to the site of Williams' trading post in Cocumscussoc was Smith's Castle (1678), which was also originally a fortified house and trading post of Richard Smith. Female sachem Quaiapen lived near Cocumscussoc and was associated with nearby Queen's Fort after inheriting her husband's lands in 1657. Eventually most of Cocumscussoc was used for agriculture with the last dairy farm closing in 1948. The creation of a railroad in the 1800s and the expansion of Route 1 greatly altered the course of Cocumscussoc Brook. Today Cocumscussoc State Park preserves much of the land surrounding Cocumscussoc Brook.

References

Rivers of Washington County, Rhode Island
Rivers of Rhode Island